"Play It Cool" is the third single from Super Furry Animals' album Radiator. It reached number 27 on the UK Singles Chart on its release in September 1997.

Release and critical reception

"Play It Cool" was released on CD, cassette and 7" on 22 September 1997 and reached number 27 on the UK Singles Chart and is a slightly different version from the one featured on their album  Radiator. The cover art is the fourth in a series of five Pete Fowler paintings commissioned by the band for Radiator and its singles. Fowler's art was inspired by "Play It Cool" and features a "mutant blue dog" according to Record Collector. The packaging of the single features the Welsh language quote "Adar o'r unlliw hedfant i'r unlle", which roughly translates into English as "Birds of a feather flock together". The track was included on the band's 'greatest hits' compilation album Songbook: The Singles, Vol. 1, issued in 2004.

Accolades

Music video

A music video was produced to accompany "Play It Cool" featuring digitised versions of the band beating Brazil in the PlayStation video game Actua Soccer 2.

Track listing 

All songs by Super Furry Animals.

CD (CRESCD275)

"Play It Cool" – 3:18
"Pass the Time" – 3:49
"Cryndod Yn Dy Lais" – 3:15

MC (CRECS275), 7" poster pack (CRE275)

"Play It Cool" – 3:18
"Pass the Time" – 3:49

Personnel
Gruff Rhys – vocals
Huw Bunford – guitar
Guto Pryce – bass guitar
Cian Ciaran – keyboards
Dafydd Ieuan – drums

Chart positions

References

Super Furry Animals songs
Creation Records singles
1997 singles
1997 songs